Ballana is a subgenus of Gloridonus in the leafhopper family Cicadellidae. There are at least 50 described species in Ballana.

Species
These species are members of the Ballana subgenus:

 Gloridonus adversus DeLong, 1937
 Gloridonus ajo Hamilton, 2014
 Gloridonus angulus DeLong, 1937
 Gloridonus aptus DeLong, 1964
 Gloridonus arcuatus DeLong, 1964
 Gloridonus atelus DeLong, 1964
 Gloridonus atridorsum Van Duzee, 1894
 Gloridonus baja Hamilton, 2014
 Gloridonus basala DeLong, 1964
 Gloridonus bifidus DeLong, 1937
 Gloridonus calceus DeLong, 1937
 Gloridonus caliperus DeLong, 1937
 Gloridonus callidus DeLong, 1937
 Gloridonus chiragricus Ball, 1900
 Gloridonus chrysothamnus DeLong & Davidson, 1934
 Gloridonus cuna DeLong, 1937
 Gloridonus curtus DeLong, 1964
 Gloridonus curvatus DeLong, 1964
 Gloridonus delea DeLong, 1937
 Gloridonus dena DeLong, 1937
 Gloridonus dolus DeLong, 1964
 Gloridonus effusus DeLong, 1964
 Gloridonus filamenta DeLong, 1937
 Gloridonus flexus DeLong, 1964
 Gloridonus forfex Hamilton, 2014
 Gloridonus gerula Ball, 1910
 Gloridonus hamus DeLong, 1937
 Gloridonus hebeus DeLong, 1937
 Gloridonus indens DeLong, 1937
 Gloridonus ipis DeLong, 1964
 Gloridonus jacumba Hamilton, 2014
 Gloridonus nigridens DeLong, 1937
 Gloridonus occidentalis DeLong, 1937
 Gloridonus ornatus DeLong, 1964
 Gloridonus orthus DeLong, 1937
 Gloridonus plenus DeLong, 1937
 Gloridonus polica DeLong, 1937
 Gloridonus projectus DeLong, 1964
 Gloridonus quintini Hamilton, 2014
 Gloridonus recurvatus DeLong, 1937
 Gloridonus secus DeLong, 1937
 Gloridonus spinosus DeLong, 1937
 Gloridonus titusi Ball, 1910
 Gloridonus traversus DeLong, 1964
 Gloridonus undatus DeLong, 1964
 Gloridonus vastulus Ball, 1910
 Gloridonus velosus DeLong, 1937
 Gloridonus venditarius Ball, 1910
 Gloridonus verutus Van Duzee, 1925
 Gloridonus vescus Ball, 1910
 Gloridonus vetulus Ball, 1910
 Gloridonus viriosus Ball, 1910
 Gloridonus visalia Ball, 1910
 Gloridonus vivatus Ball, 1910
 Gloridonus yolo Hamilton, 2014

References

Further reading

 

Deltocephalinae
Insect subgenera